Kadowaki (written: 門脇) is a Japanese surname. Notable people with the surname include:

, Japanese mixed martial artist
, Japanese voice actress
, Japanese television and film actress
, Japanese bobsledder

See also
Kadowaki–Woods ratio, named for physicists  and S.B. Woods

Japanese-language surnames